Infiltration may refer to:

Science, medicine, and engineering
Infiltration (hydrology), downward movement of water into soil
Infiltration (HVAC), a heating, ventilation, and air conditioning term for air leakage into buildings
Infiltration (medical), the diffusion or accumulation of substances or cells not normal to it or in amounts in excess of the normal
Infiltration/Inflow, leakage of groundwater into sanitary sewers

Other uses
Entryism, the infiltration by a political organisation of another, usually larger, organisation
In espionage, using double agents to join an enemy organization
Infiltration tactics, tactics developed by the German army in early 1915 that broke the trench-warfare stalemate on the western front
Urban exploration, exploring parts of towns, etc. which are normally off-limits
Infiltration (zine), a popular urban exploration zine/website created by Jeff Chapman (Ninjalicious)
Seon-Woo Lee (born 1985), professional electronic sports players, specializing in fighting games, who plays under the alias Infiltration
Infiltration (2017 film), a Canadian film
Infiltration (2022 film), Russian war drama film

See also
 Infiltrator (disambiguation)